The British Independent Film Award for Best Cinematography is an annual award given to the cinematographer's work that has been deemed "best" in a particular year for their work in independent British cinema. The award was introduced in 2017. Before its inception, cinematography was included in the category named Best Technical Achievement.

Winners and nominees

2000s
 Best Technical Achievement

2010s
 Best Technical Achievement

 Best Cinematography

2020s

References

External links
 Official website

British Independent Film Awards
Awards for best cinematography